Sam Hamilton (born July 26, 1995) is an American soccer player who plays for New Mexico United in the USL Championship as either a center back or as a central defensive midfielder.

Career

College
Hamilton played four years of college soccer at the University of Denver between 2013 and 2016, where he made 83 appearances, scored 3 goals and tallied 13 assists.

Club
On January 13, 2017, Hamilton was selected in the first round (15th overall) of the 2017 MLS SuperDraft by Colorado Rapids. He signed with the club on March 4, 2017.

Hamilton made three league appearances in MLS with Colorado Rapids, and spent the rest of his rookie season on loan with Phoenix Rising. He made 9 starts in 14 appearances with Phoenix, scoring his first professional goal against Charlotte Independence September 16, 2017.

On August 10, 2017, Hamilton was loaned to United Soccer League side Phoenix Rising FC.

On November 28, 2018, he signed with New Mexico United of the USL Championship, following his release by Colorado Rapids.

In New Mexico United’s inaugural season, Hamilton made 16 starts in 20 league appearances at center back and central midfield, helping lead the team to its first-ever playoff appearance. 

In U.S. Open Cup play, Hamilton contributed to two upset victories over MLS opposition. On June 12, he played a full 120 minutes against his former club Colorado Rapids in a shootout victory. In the following Round of 16 on June 19, Hamilton scored the game-winning goal in the 64th minute to upset MLS side FC Dallas and advance to the tournament’s quarterfinals.

Career statistics

References

External links

Denver profile

1995 births
Living people
American soccer players
Denver Pioneers men's soccer players
Colorado Rapids players
Colorado Springs Switchbacks FC players
Phoenix Rising FC players
Soccer players from Colorado
Sportspeople from the Denver metropolitan area
Major League Soccer players
USL Championship players
Association football midfielders
People from Evergreen, Colorado
Colorado Rapids draft picks
New Mexico United players